Atrophothele is a monotypic genus of Asian brushed trapdoor spiders containing the single species, Atrophothele socotrana. It was first described by Reginald Innes Pocock in 1903, and has only been found in Yemen.

References

Barychelidae
Monotypic Mygalomorphae genera
Spiders of Asia
Taxa named by R. I. Pocock